Gialaia is a genus of crickets in family Gryllidae and tribe Gryllini.  A discontinuous distribution of records, between Madagascar, Indo-China and New Guinea is almost certainly incomplete.

Taxonomy
The genus contains the two subgenera:
 subgenus Eugialaia Gorochov, 2001 - New Guinea
 Gialaia calva Gorochov, 2001 
 Gialaia dichroa Gorochov, 2001 
 Gialaia monochroa Gorochov, 2001 
 Gialaia strasbergi Hugel, 2014 
 subgenus Gialaia Gorochov, 1994 - Madagascar, Indo-China
 Gialaia africana Gorochov & Kostia, 1999 
 Gialaia khaoyai Gorochov, 2001 
 Gialaia koncharangi Gorochov, 2001 
 Gialaia microptera Gorochov, 1994 
 Gialaia nhatrangi Gorochov, 2001 
 Gialaia ottei Gorochov, 1994 - type species (locality Vietnam)
 Gialaia tamdao Gorochov, 2001 
 Gialaia thai Gorochov, 2001

References

Gryllinae
Orthoptera genera
Orthoptera of Indo-China